The Aviation Secretary of Pakistan is the Federal Secretary for the Aviation Division. The position holder is a BPS-22 grade officer, usually belonging to the Pakistan Administrative Service. The position of Secretary of Aviation is considered to be a coveted one, with the Secretary being in charge of major establishments including the Pakistan Civil Aviation Authority, Pakistan International Airlines, Airports Security Force, and Pakistan Meteorological Department. Shoukat Ali is the current Aviation Secretary of Pakistan.

See also
 Civil aviation authority
 Airport Security Force
 Pakistan International Airlines
 Airlines of Pakistan

References

Federal government ministries of Pakistan